is a Japanese adult animated historical drama film based on part of the 17th century novel of the same name by Ihara Saikaku.

References

External links
 
 Review at AniPages Daily

1682 novels
1991 anime OVAs
Drama anime and manga
Japanese novels